A. Ramasamy is an Indian politician and incumbent Member of the Tamil Nadu Legislative Assembly from the Nilakottai constituency. He represents the Puthiya Tamilagam party.

References 

Members of the Tamil Nadu Legislative Assembly
Living people
Year of birth missing (living people)
Place of birth missing (living people)